is a yamashiro, or castle situated on a hill, located in Izushi, Hyōgo Prefecture, Japan.

History
For more than 200 years the Yamana Family resided at Konosumi Castle. In 1569 the castle fell to attacks by Oda Nobunaga's successor Toyotomi Hideyoshi. After the fall of Konosumi Castle, Yamana Suketoyo built another at Mt. Ariko to the Southeast, but it too fell to Hideyoshi in 1580. In 1604 Koide Yoshihide built Izushi castle at the base of Mt. Ariko.

In 1979 a corner yagura in the Honmaru and the Tojomon were rebuilt. On the castle grounds you'll also find a small shrine. The bright red Torii gate makes a nice contrast with the castle walls. Izushi Castle is a well known spot in the spring for viewing cherry blossoms. On November 3 they have a castle festival with a mock sankin kotai presentation.

Izushi Castle itself is small with no one particular sightseeing point. However, the castle town is a calm, quiet town with old samurai homes and shops that remind you of the Edo Period. Rice fields and nature spread out around the town. Izushisara Soba is a tasty local dish. Have some soba while watching the view of the town and let your imagination slip back into the Edo Period. On weekends, the town tends to swell with tourists. It provides a nice small trip.

Today
In 1979, the Tojomon (Tojo gate) and the Nishisumiyagura in the honmaru were re-built. Besides these reconstructions, only the castle's ruins still remain, though the city of Izushi retains its grid layout which was arranged for militatry purposes around the castle. A shrine is sited within the ruins, with 37 torii and 157 stone steps leading up to it. On the remains of the mihariyagura stands the Shinkoro, a traditional Japanese wooden clock tower. Following the Meiji Restoration, a western-style clock was installed in it. It is seen as the symbol of the town.

Sources
 http://www.yomiuri.co.jp/dy/columns/0005/lens137.htm
 https://web.archive.org/web/20080504120839/http://www.jcastle.info/castle/profile/24-Izushi-Castle

Further reading

References

External links 
Izushi Castle

Castles in Hyōgo Prefecture